This is a list of epistemologists, that is, people who theorize about the nature of knowledge, belief formation and the nature of justification. This list is by necessity incomplete, since countless other philosophers also deal with epistemological issues in their work.

Ancient philosophy

Medieval philosophy

Modern philosophy

Contemporary philosophy 

 
Epistemologists